{{DISPLAYTITLE:C8H12O4}}
The molecular formula C8H12O4 (molar mass: 172.178 g/mol) may refer to:

 Diethyl maleate
 1,6-Dioxecane-2,7-dione
 Methacrolein diacetate
 1,4-Cyclohexanedicarboxylic acid

Molecular formulas